Podlachia, or Podlasie, is a historical region in the north-eastern part of Poland. Between 1513 and 1795 it was a voivodeship with the capital in Drohiczyn. Now the part north of the Bug River is included in the modern Podlaskie Voivodeship with the capital in Białystok.

Names and etymology

There are two hypotheses regarding the origin of the name of the region. According to the first one, the name is derived from the Polish word las ("forest"), and means "near the forest". A common folk derivation is from the Proto-Slavic word les or las meaning "forest", i.e., it is "by the wood(s)" or an "area of forests", making Podlachia close in meaning to adjacent Polesia. The theory has been questioned, as it does not properly take into consideration the vowel shifts "a" > "e" > "i" in various Slavic languages (in fact, it mixes vowels from different languages).

According to the second theory, the name is derived from the word liakh (or lach, "Pole"), and means "near Poland". The second theory holds that the term comes from the expression pod Lachem, which may be translated literally as "under the Poles" (see: Lechia). Some claim it to mean "under Polish rule", though in the Middle Ages Podlachia was only partially under Polish rule, and since 1446 until 1569 the area belonged to the Grand Duchy of Lithuania. A better variant of this theory holds that the name originates from the period when the territory was within the Trakai Voivodeship of the Grand Duchy of Lithuania, along the borderline with the Mazovia province, primarily a fief of the Poland of the Piasts and later on part of the Kingdom of Poland of the Jagiellons.

Geography

Podlachia is located along the middle stretch of the Bug River between Mazovia in the west, Polesia and Volhynia in the east, the Narew River in the north and the Chełm Land in the south. The borders of Podlachia changed with time and was not the same as historical Podlaskie Voivodeship. Podlachia is sometimes divided into two parts (southern and northern), which had different administrative subordination.

Traditional capital of Podlachia is Drohiczyn that lies into northern and southern parts. The former is included in the modern-day Podlaskie Voivodeship with its capital at Białystok (the historical boundary goes exactly through the city). Sometimes, Siedlce has been considered the capital of the region.

History

Podlaskie Voivodeship is a multicultural and multi-religious region. It is the region where people's identity has been shaped throughout history by both the Orthodox and Roman Catholic churches, and since the Reformation, also by Evangelical churches. Until today, Podlaskie has been considered Poland's most culturally diverse region. Throughout its early history, Podlachia was inhabited by various tribes of different ethnic roots. In the 9th and 10th centuries, the area was inhabited by East Slavs tribes, mostly by Drevlians, with settlements of Dregoviches to the north beyond the Narew River and likely Dulebes to the south., although Masovian like population had been also present. In the 14th century the area was annexed by the Grand Duchy of Lithuania, though later on it still briefly fell under Mazovian Piast rule. In 1446, Podlachia became part of the Grand Duchy, but since 1496 southwestern parts of Podlachia (Drohiczyn Land and Mielnik Land) and since 1501 the northern part (Bielsk Land) used Polish law instead of Lithuanian. In 1513 King Sigismund I the Old formed the Podlaskie Voivodeship (adjective of Podlasie). In 1566, the southeastern part of Podlachia became part of the newly formed Brest Litovsk Voivodeship as the Brest Litovsk County. In 1569, after the Union of Lublin, Podlasie was ceded to the Kingdom of Poland. It was the northernmost part of the Lesser Poland Province of the Polish Crown. The voivodeship was divided in three lands: the Drohiczyn, Mielnik and Bielsk Land. In the 18th and 19th century the private town of Białystok became the main center of the region, thanks to the patronage of the Branicki family and the textile industry development. After the Third Partition of Poland in 1795, Podlachia was divided between the Kingdom of Prussia, the Habsburg monarchy and the Russian Empire. In 1807, the western part of Podlachia became part of the Duchy of Warsaw, a semi-independent Polish entity, while the eastern part including Białystok fell under Russian rule.

In 1842 the northern Podlachia (Bielsk Podlaski county) became part of Grodno Governorate, and the southern Podlachia was assigned to Congress Poland of Russian Empire. According to the Russian Imperial Census of 1897, the most spoken languages in Siedlce Governorate (that included southern Podlachia) were Polish (66.13%), Yiddish (15.56%) and Ukrainian (13.95%). At the same time the most spoken languages in Bielsk Podlaski county (northern Podlachia) were Ukrainian (39.1%), Polish (34.9%), Yiddish (14.9%), Russian (5.9%) and Belarusian (4.9%).

In the 19th century the region was a stronghold of Polish resistance against Russian rule. The last partisan of the January Uprising Stanisław Brzóska operated here until 1865. He was hanged publicly by the Russians in Sokołów Podlaski in May 1865. Poland regained Podlachia after restoring independence in 1918.

Demographics

Ethnic situation

While today Podlachia is mostly inhabited by Poles, many Belarusians live in the eastern parts. According to Polish census of 2002, in Podlaskie Voivodeship there were 46,041 Belarusians (3.9%) and 1,366 Ukrainians (0.1%). Autochthonous inhabitants have difficulties in national self-identification and identifying of their language. They often identify their nationality as "tutejszy" (literally "locals"). Based on comparison of a survey and the census, Marek Barwiński supposes that people with a low level of national identity during the census usually choose the major nationality in their region.

Orthodox autochthonous inhabitants are known as khakhly (without any negative connotations, though today in Ukraine it is known as an ethnic slur for Ukrainians). According to Mykhailo Lesiv, this name appeared after it was used to denote locals in the Russian Imperial Army. Many scientific researches prove that the orthodox population in Podlachia have Ukrainian origin (19th century censuses, historical and linguistic researches), though today the number of people with the Ukrainian identity is very small.

Until the 19th century, Podlachia was populated by the Polish-speaking yeomanry (drobna szlachta), Jews (primarily in towns), and Ruthenian Greek-Catholics speaking a dialect related to modern Ukrainian – the so-called Khakhlak (Chachlak) dialect, which derived its name from a derogatory term for Ukrainians (khakhol or khokhol being the name of the traditional haircut of Ukrainian Cossacks).

In the 19th century, the inhabitants of Podlachia were under the rule of the Russian Empire, with southern Podlachia constituting a part of Russian-controlled Congress Poland. After 1831, Russian authorities forbade the Greek-Catholic faith in northern Podlachia and it disappeared from the area. In 1875, Russians forbade this rite in the southern portion as well, and all Greek-Catholic inhabitants were forced to accept the Eastern Orthodox faith. However, the resistance of the local people was surprisingly strong and Ruthenian speakers from this area rejected the separation from the Pope. In 1874, blessed Wincenty Lewoniuk and 12 companions were killed by Russian soldiers in Pratulin. In reaction to these measures, the Ruthenians of southern Podlachia began to identify themselves with the national movement of the Roman Catholic Poles. To preserve the full communion with the Pope, they changed their rite from Eastern to Latin before the compulsory conversion of Greek Catholics into Orthodox. In 1912, Russian authorities issued a tolerance edict that made it possible to change confession from Orthodox to Roman Catholic (but not to Greek-Catholic, which had been completely deleted). A majority of the inhabitants of southern Podlachia changed their faith from Orthodox to Roman Catholic. At present, very few people in this area speak Ruthenian and nearly all consider themselves Poles. Meanwhile, the eastern part of northern Podlachia is still populated by Belarusians.

Podlachia is also the cultural center of Poland's small Tatar minority as well. After the annexation of eastern Poland into the Soviet Union following World War II, Poland was left with only 2 Tatar villages, Bohoniki and Kruszyniany (both outside the historical borders of Podlachia). Some Tatars from the territories annexed to the USSR have been repatriated to Poland and clustered in cities, particularly Białystok. In 1925 the Muslim Religious Union (Muzułmański Związek Religijny) was formed in Białystok. In 1992, the Union of Tatars of the Republic of Poland (Związek Tatarów Rzeczypospolitej Polskiej) with autonomous branches in Białystok and Gdańsk began operating.

Language
The dominant language in Podlaskie Voivodeship is Polish. Autochthonous inhabitants speak . Many linguists relate them to the Ukrainian language. Linguists have been exploring them since 19th century, when they were also known as Siedlce dialects (because of the name of Siedlce Governorate, where the dialects were mostly investigated). In the Northern Podlachia Podlachian subdialects are also often considered to be Belarusian dialects or sometimes Ruthenian dialects.

Since the locals are known as khakhly, the local language is also called Khakhlatska mova ("khokhols' language"). S. Zhelekhov wrote in 1884 that the people call their language "Polesian, but those, who were in the army (in the soldiers) call it Khakhlatska".

Cities and towns

Gallery

References

Sources
 
 
Górczyk, Wojciech Jerzy (2020),  The Former Reformati Order’s Monasteries Route Węgrów.
Górczyk, Wojciech Jerzy (2018),  Reformaci w Węgrowie. Architektura kościoła i miejsce fundacji węgrowskiej na tle działalności fundacyjnej Krasińskich Drohiczyński Przeglad Naukowy. Drohiczyńskie Towarzystwo Naukowe: 307–326.
 

Divided regions
Historical regions in Belarus
Historical regions in Poland
Historical regions in Ukraine